Javier Jiménez may refer to:
Javier Jiménez Espriú (born 1937), Mexican academic
Javier Jiménez (swimmer) (born 1948), Mexican swimmer
Javier Jiménez (Costa Rican footballer) (born 1952), Costa Rican football winger
Javier Jiménez (mayor) (born 1952), Puerto Rican politician and mayor of San Sebastián
Javi Jiménez (footballer, born 1979), Spanish football attacking midfielder
Javi Jiménez (footballer, born 1987), Spanish football goalkeeper
Javier Jiménez (volleyball) (born 1989), Cuban volleyball player
Javi Jiménez (footballer, born 1996), Spanish football leftback
Javi Jiménez (footballer, born 1997), Spanish football centre-back
Javier Jiménez (footballer, born 2000), Aruban football midfielder